RefWorks is a web-based commercial reference management software package. It is produced by Ex Libris, a ProQuest company. RefWorks LLC was founded in 2001 as a partnership between Earl B. Beutler (development and customer service) and  Cambridge Scientific Abstracts (sales and marketing)  from 2002 until being acquired by ProQuest in 2008.

Functionality and features
Users' reference databases are stored online, allowing them to be accessed and updated from any computer with an internet connection. Institutional licenses allow universities to subscribe to RefWorks on behalf of all their students, faculty and staff. Individual licenses are also available. The software enables linking from a user's RefWorks account to electronic editions of journals to which the institution's library subscribes. This linking is accomplished by incorporating an institution's OpenURL resolver.

Many bibliographic database providers have implemented the ability to export references directly to RefWorks. In some cases (e.g. PubMed) reference citations must be saved to the user's computer as text files and then imported into RefWorks. In 2005 the bibliographic database Scopus formed a partnership with RefWorks to allow enhanced integration between the two products.

A word processor integration utility called Write-N-Cite enables users to insert reference codes from their RefWorks accounts into Microsoft Word documents, which can then be formatted to produce in-text citations and reference lists in various styles. A new version of Write-N-Cite (WNC4) for Mac was released in early 2012.

In 2005 RefWorks introduced a module called RefShare, which allows users to make public all or part of their RefWorks databases. This is done by creating a URL for a read-only version of the database or folder, which can be emailed or posted to a website. RefShare folders can also be used to create RSS feeds that are updated when new citations are added to the database.

RefMobile, a mobile phone interface, was introduced in 2009.

RefWorks includes RefGrab-It, a utility designed to capture bibliographic information from websites. , it was optimized to work with Amazon, Google Scholar, PubMed, Wikipedia, the BBC, USA TODAY, The New York Times, and the Los Angeles Times. The utility works with Firefox and Internet Explorer browsers only.

RefWorks-COS launched the current user interface, RefWorks 2.0, in 2010.

In 2016, ProQuest launched New RefWorks, featuring new functionality such as the ability to drag and drop PDFs, and a Save to RefWorks utility as a replacement for RefGrab-It. RefWorks 2.0 was rebranded as Legacy RefWorks and users were given the option of upgrading from Legacy to New RefWorks.

Canadian university access
In 2004 the Ontario Council of University Libraries (OCUL) consortium licensed RefWorks on behalf of its 20 member institutions. The RefWorks software was mounted on data servers belonging to Scholars Portal, which provides the platform for the digital resources licensed by OCUL. In addition to the software, data in RefWorks users accounts belonging to member institutions are housed on the Scholars Portal servers at the University of Toronto. A number of other Canadian academic libraries that license RefWorks have since contracted for access through Scholars Portal, so that their data also resides on the servers in Toronto. According to news reports, this was due to concerns that information about individuals' research interests, represented by data stored on RefWorks servers in the United States, could be vulnerable to scrutiny under the terms of the USA Patriot Act.

As of mid 2015 OCUL will no longer host RefWorks on its servers in Canada. Some academic libraries chose to migrate their data to the RefWorks servers located outside of Canada, while others ceased their subscription to RefWorks.

See also
 Comparison of reference management software
 Office Open XML software
 OpenDocument software

References

External links
Ex Libris RefWorks - Reference Management (Website)
Ex Libris RefWorks - Login page

ProQuest
Reference management software